The Cemetery Club is a 2006 Israeli documentary film directed by Tali Shemesh.

The film opened the 2006 DocAviv film festival, to rave reviews and several awards. It then went on to screenings at many international festivals, including the Cannes Film Festival, and won the White Dove award at Dok Leipzig. It is considered the most successful Israeli documentary ever.

Synopsis 
The film follows five years of meetings of a group of elderly Holocaust survivors who came to Israel from Poland after World War II. They meet each week at the Mount Herzl Cemetery in Jerusalem, where they have discussions and read their own writings. The group has association rules, called "the Mt. Herzl Academy".

The group includes the director's grandmother, Minia, and her great-aunt Lena. Over the recorded period, some of the group's members pass away, affecting relationships within the group and causing Holocaust memories to surface.

Production 

The film was financed by Channel 8, Noga Communications, and the New Film and Television Fund, with a budget of $110,000. It was produced by Asaf Amir and Guy Lavi of Norma Production Company.

Reception 

Haaretz's Uri Klein described the film as both touching and endearing, and he commended the director's balanced and discreet treatment of the subjects. In Yedioth Ahronoth, Shmulik Duvdevani called the film "moving" and "beautiful", and praised Shemesh for the sensitive way she portrayed the group and its members: "With great intelligence, Shemesh avoids turning the seniors' meetings into an anthropological curiosity".

Awards

References

External links 
 
 
 

2006 documentary films
2006 films
2000s Hebrew-language films
Holocaust survivors
Israeli documentary films
Mount Herzl